The 2002 World Men's Curling Championship (branded as 2002 Ford World Men's Curling Championship for sponsorship reasons) was held April 6–14, 2002 at the Bismarck Civic Center in Bismarck, North Dakota.

Teams

Round-robin standings

Round-robin results

Draw 1

Draw 2

Draw 3

Draw 4

Draw 5

Draw 6

Draw 7

Draw 8

Draw 9

Playoffs

Brackets

Semifinals

Bronze medal game

Gold medal game

Top player percentages

References

2002
Curling Championship
Bismarck–Mandan
2002 in American sports
2002 in sports in North Dakota
Curling competitions in Bismarck, North Dakota
April 2002 sports events in the United States
International curling competitions hosted by the United States